LTBL may refer to:
 Lessons to Be Learned, an album by Australian singer-songwriter Gabriella Cilmi.
 The ICAO code for Çiğli Air Base, a military airport in Turkey.
 Leukoencephalopathy with thalamus and brainstem involvement and high lactate, a rare disorder that affects the brain.